Mohammad Naved (born 1 September 1988) is a Pakistani cricketer. He played more than 50 first-class cricket matches for Lahore and State Bank of Pakistan between 2007–08 and 2014–15. He also represented Pakistan at Under-19 level.

References

External links
 

1988 births
Living people
Pakistani cricketers
Lahore cricketers
Cricketers from Lahore